Charles Earl Weaver, Jr. (born July 12, 1949) is a former American football linebacker in the National Football League (NFL).

Early life
Weaver was born in Greenwood, Mississippi and attended Richmond High School in Richmond, California.

College career
Weaver was a 1970 All-American defensive end at the University of Southern California.  He was also All-Pac-8, USC's Most Inspirational Player in 1970.

In 1969, he teamed with Al Cowlings and Jimmy Gunn, and the late Tody Smith and Bubba Scott to form a defensive front that powered the Trojans to 10-0-1 record and a win over the University of Michigan in the 1970 Rose Bowl.  Coach John McKay credited a six-man front on defense for the victory, big Tony Terry was added to the group known as the "Wild Bunch" consisting of Jimmy Gunn, Charlie Weaver, Al Cowlings, Tody Smith and Bubba Scott.

Professional career
Weaver was selected in the second round of the 1971 NFL Draft by the Detroit Lions, where he played for 10 seasons.  He also played for the Washington Redskins in 1981.

References

External links
 

1949 births
Living people
People from Greenwood, Mississippi
All-American college football players
American football linebackers
Detroit Lions players
USC Trojans football players
Washington Redskins players
Richmond High School (Richmond, California) alumni